Aleksei Vladimirovich Ilyin (born 6 March 1978) is a former Russian professional football player.

Club career
He played 3 seasons in the Russian Football National League for FC Arsenal Tula and FC Dynamo Bryansk.

External links
 

1978 births
Sportspeople from Tula, Russia
Living people
Russian footballers
Association football midfielders
FC Vityaz Podolsk players
FC Arsenal Tula players
FC Dynamo Bryansk players